City Park Stadium is a soccer specific-stadium located in New Rochelle, New York. The official name of the stadium is "Skidelsky Field at City Park Stadium". Its main tenant is the Westchester Flames FC soccer club who play in USL League Two, the fourth tier of American soccer. The team plays in the league's Northeast Division. The stadium's capacity is 1,845.

References 

Sports in New Rochelle, New York
Soccer venues in the New York metropolitan area
Sports venues in Westchester County, New York
Buildings and structures in New Rochelle, New York